Fitzroy Hutton (1894–1975) was a Royal Navy officer during World War II.

He commanded the light cruiser  in 1936–1939, then commanded the aircraft carrier  in 1939–1940 before becoming Chief of Staff for the Commander-in-Chief, China, in 1940–1941.

Citations

Bibliography
 

1894 births
1975 deaths
Royal Navy admirals of World War II
Royal Navy officers of World War I
Royal Navy officers of World War II